The Antelope Valley Press, colloquially referred to as the Valley Press or AV Press by its staff and Antelope Valley residents, is the largest-circulation daily newspaper in Palmdale, California, United States. It had been a family-owned business since beginning as a weekly newspaper in 1915, until June 30, 2017, when it was assimilated into Canadian publisher Steven Malkowich's consortium of holdings.

Coverage area
The Valley Press covers the fast-growing Antelope Valley, especially the Palmdale/Lancaster Urbanized Area (a US Census Bureau defined term) and adjacent areas of north Los Angeles and southeastern Kern counties, including the upscale Los Angeles urban escapes of Acton and Agua Dulce. Other areas the Valley Press occasionally covers, particularly for aerospace related stories and local high school and college level sports, include the Victor Valley, Bakersfield, and southern San Joaquin Valley areas.

Competitors in its market are the Daily News - Antelope Valley and the Los Angeles Times, both based in Los Angeles.

History
The Valley Press was founded by A.J. Hicks on Saturday, April 3, 1915, as the Palmdale Post. At the time, the Valley was home to about 3,500 people. Over the decades of the 20th century, the newspaper changed hands, and there were a few name changes as well. On May 4, 1950, the paper became known as the South Antelope Valley Press.

On July 1, 1958, four men initiated a partnership between the Markham and Odett families. Arthur F. Folz was president of the board of directors in 1958, with brothers Ralph H. and  Maurice W. Markham as vice presidents and Lamont Odett Sr. as secretary-treasurer. Ralph bought out his brother and Odett bought out Folz on April 1, 1961, to create a new partnership (of Ralph H. Markham and Lamont Odett Sr.) In October 1975, Odett died and sons, Bill and Lamont, became co-publishers. On March 1, 1981, William C. Markham  joined the Odetts in daily management of the paper and was elected corporate vice president and advertising director. Markham became president of the board of directors after Ralph H. Markham's death in November 1985.

The Odett family ran day-to-day operations of The Yuma Morning Sun (now The Yuma Sun) circa 1925 to 1935 in Yuma, Arizona. When the Morning Sun changed ownership in 1935, the Odetts moved to Los Angeles's San Fernando Valley and later to Palmdale, California.

The Markham family having become sole owners in January, 1994, William C. Markham its president and publisher. The Markham family had ben in the Newspaper business in Los Angeles County for multiple generations. While the weren't technically from the AV, they were local owners and ran the paper with an eye towards community news and engagement.

The paper later dropped the "South" from its nameplate to become the Antelope Valley Press by the early 1960s. It was a Thursday afternoon weekly until 1959 when a Sunday edition debuted. The Tuesday edition was added in 1969, followed by Friday (1982) and Wednesday (1988), Saturday (1992) and finally the Monday edition in 1998, making the Antelope Valley Press a full-fledged daily newspaper - perhaps the first Mojave Desert, California-based newspaper to commence daily publishing with morning delivery. 

The paper remained in family hands, and had never been corporately owned until June 30, 2017, when the Mr. Markham, who was well past retirement age, finally sold. The buyer group was led by Canadian publisher, Steven Malkowich, who had been trying to acquire the AV Press for a number of years. Malkowich works for disgraced media executive David Radler and his daughter Melanie Walsh. 

Known as "The Tuesday Massacre", on July 25, 2017, less than a month into the Malkowich acquisition, newly installed management summarily pink-slipped 17 senior staff. The largest lay-off in Antelope Valley Press history, 17 senior employees were systematically ordered into the office at day's end, handed State of California EDD unemployment insurance pamphlets by Malkowich's newly installed enterprise management team, before being told they had 10 minutes to clean out their desks, and vacate the premises.

Printing technology

The Valley Press was famed locally from the late 1950s for its peach-colored newsprint while under the Odett/Markham family ownership. The paper stopped using peach newsprint in 1975 due to expense and the increased use of color ink.

The newspaper moved into the digital age beginning in 1986 when City Editor Bill MacKenzie was given the assignment to find a publishing system. The result of that search was the installation of a Morris Publishing System network of personal computers for both classified and editorial requirements. That classified system was replaced in 1999 with Digital Technology Internal equipment. Editorial followed in 2002 to make the paper completely paginated in one system. The classified system was upgraded in early 2005; the editorial system by year's end.

Awards
Dennis Anderson, a former wire-service reporter, became editor of the Valley Press in 1999. In December 2010, the Los Angeles Professional Chapter of the Society of Professional Journalists announced that he would be one of five distinguished journalists to be honored by the chapter at its March 2011 awards banquet, representing the print under 100,000 circulation category. 

SPJ cited the paper as the only family-owned independent daily newspaper in Los Angeles County and the winner of six general excellence rankings from the National Newspaper Association, one from Suburban Newspapers of America and a first place Freedom of Information award from the California Newspaper Publishers Association. 

In 2004, SNA and the American Press Institute named Anderson Journalist of the Year for his articles, written while embedded with the California National Guard in Iraq, about local citizen soldiers.

A Valley Press legacy to the motorists of the Antelope Valley, as well as California and beyond is the Antelope Valley Freeway, which Lamont "Monty" Odett, Sr., championed in dealing with California state legislators in the 1950s and 1960s. Lamont Odett Vista Point - an Antelope Valley freeway rest area overlooking Palmdale - is named in his honor.

References

Sources
 Larsen, Lisa. "Antelope Valley Press buys complete system from DTI". Newspapers and Technology. Retrieved September 4, 2007.
 "Important Dates in Palmdale and Antelope Valley History". Palmdale City Library. Retrieved September 4, 2007. 
 "Bill Mackenzie". Palmdale High School. Retrieved September 4, 2007.

External links
 Antelope Valley Press home page

Daily newspapers published in Greater Los Angeles
Antelope Valley
Mass media in Palmdale, California
Mass media in Los Angeles County, California
Publications established in 1915
1915 establishments in California
Articles with permanently dead external links